The 1996 BPR International Endurance GT Series was the third and final season of BPR Global GT Series. It is a series for Grand Touring style cars broken into two classes based on power and manufacturer involvement, called GT1 and GT2. It began on 3 March 1996 and ended 3 November 1996 after 11 races. After the end of the season, two promotional races were held in Brazil, in the circuits of Curitiba (8 December 1996) and Brasília (16 December 1996).

This was the final season of the BPR series before it came under the control of the FIA to become the FIA GT Championship in 1997. This was also the first year that the classes of competitors were trimmed to just GT1 and GT2.

Schedule

Entries

GT1

GT2

Season results

Non-Championship events
Following the conclusion of the season in November, two exhibition races were held in Brazil for BPR competitors.

References

External links
 1996 BPR Global GT Series season

BPR Global GT Series
BPR Global GT